The Reformed Theological College (RTC) is the theological college supported by the Christian Reformed Churches of Australia, the Reformed Churches of New Zealand, and the Reformed Presbyterian Church of Australia. It is located in the Melbourne CBD, Victoria, Australia.

RTC accredited through the Australian College of Theology and is a member of the South Pacific Association of Bible Colleges.

RTC has published the Vox Reformata annual journal since 1962.

RTC Melbourne Campus
RTC classes are held at the Melbourne Campus. Close to public transport and in the heart of Melbourne, RTC is highly accessible to students from greater Melbourne and interstate.

Notable alumni
The founding members of the band Sons of Korah attended RTC and formed the band while studying there.

References

External links
RTC website
Australian College of Theology profile
Victoria Eduweb profile

Australian College of Theology
Buildings and structures in Geelong
Reformed church seminaries and theological colleges
Schools in Geelong
Reformed Presbyterian Church (denominational group)
Educational institutions established in 1954
1954 establishments in Australia